The 2007 Singer Sri Lankan Airlines Rugby 7s was the ninth year of the Singer Sri Lankan Airlines Rugby 7s tournament. Hong Kong defeated South Korea 37 points to 5 in the final of the Cup.

First round

Pool A

 33 - 10 
 45 - 19  
 36 - 05 
 45 - 00 
  47 - 12  
 28 - 12  
 55 - 00 
 17 - 17  
 47 - 00 
 Won - Lost 

{| class="wikitable" style="text-align: center;"
|-
!width="200"|Teams
!width="40"|Pld
!width="40"|W
!width="40"|D
!width="40"|L
!width="40"|PF
!width="40"|PA
!width="40"|+/−
!width="40"|Pts
|-style="background:#ccffcc"
|align=left| 
|4||4||0||0||171||27||+144||12
|-style="background:#ccffcc"
|align=left| 
|4||3||0||1||?||?||?||10
|-style="background:#ffe6bd"
|align=left| 
|4||1||1||2||?||?||?||7
|-style="background:#ffe6bd"
|align=left| 
|4||1||1||2||86||111||−25||7
|-style="background:#fcc6bd"
|align=left| 
|4||0||0||4||19||192||−173||4
|}

Pool B

 24 - 15 
 50 - 00 
 15 - 12 
 59 - 00 
 15 - 12 
 19 - 12 
 41 - 00 
 33 - 00 
 19 - 05 
 Won - Lost 

{| class="wikitable" style="text-align: center;"
|-
!width="200"|Teams
!width="40"|Pld
!width="40"|W
!width="40"|D
!width="40"|L
!width="40"|PF
!width="40"|PA
!width="40"|+/−
!width="40"|Pts
|-style="background:#ccffcc"
|align=left| 
|4||4||0||0||?||?||?||12
|-style="background:#ccffcc"
|align=left| 
|4||3||0||1||84||24||+60||10
|-style="background:#ffe6bd"
|align=left| 
|4||2||0||2||89||45||+44||8
|-style="background:#ffe6bd"
|align=left| 
|4||1||0||3||?||?||?||6
|-style="background:#fcc6bd"
|align=left| 
|4||0||0||4||5||169||-164||4
|}

Second round

Bowl

Plate

Cup

References

2007
2007 rugby sevens competitions
2007 in Asian rugby union
rugby sevens